Nora Nash is a Sister of St. Francis of Philadelphia and shareholder activist. She is a member of the Philadelphia Coalition for Responsible Investment as well as the Interfaith Center on Corporate Responsibility (ICCR). Nash is also a speaker at Neumann University and other universities on justice and advocacy.

Early life 
Nash grew up in Limerick County, Ireland. In her early life, Nash dreamed of becoming a missionary in Africa, but in 1959, she arrived in Pennsylvania to join the Sisters of St. Francis, an order founded in 1855 by Mother Francis Bachmann, a Bavarian immigrant-focused on social justice. Nash took her Franciscan vows of chastity, poverty, and obedience two years later, in 1961.

Shareholder advocacy 

Nash is the director of corporate responsibility for the Sisters of St. Francis of Philadelphia.

Wells Fargo 
On April 24, 2017, Mercury news reported that Nash was a co-filer of a resolution that demanded that Wells Fargo's board order a comprehensive report about the root causes of the bank's fraudulent activity in a September 2016 scandal involving unauthorized cross-selling and the creation of fake accounts, and the steps taken to improve risk management and control processes.

Exxon Mobil 
Nash was part of a group of investors, who in 2017, put forth a historic climate-change resolution at ExxonMobil which was passed  with 62 percent of shareholders voting "yes".  ExxonMobil board had recommended voting against the resolution.

Awards and recognition 
Nash has been recognized by the Interfaith Center on Corporate Responsibility as well as in a November 12, 2011 profile in the New York Times which referred to Nash as "one of the most surprising" corporate activists for her shareholder advocacy work.

References 

American religious leaders
Shareholder-rights activists
Year of birth missing (living people)
Living people